Zorlu is a Turkish surname. It is also used as a masculine given name. People with the name include:

Surname

Ahmet Nazif Zorlu (born 1944), Turkish businessman
Ergün Zorlu, Turkish tennis player
Fatin Rüştü Zorlu (1910–1961), Turkish diplomat and politician
Hacı Mehmet Zorlu (1919–2005), Turkish businessman 
Haydar Zorlu (born 1967), Turkish-German actor
Sinan Zorlu (born 1995), Turkish badminton player
Yakup Ramazan Zorlu (born 1991), French-born Turkish football player

Given name
 Zorlu Tore (born 1956), Turkish Cypriot politician

See also
 Zorlu (disambiguation)

Turkish-language surnames
Turkish masculine given names